Pellifronia jungi is a species of sea snail, a marine gastropod mollusk in the family Terebridae, the auger snails.

Description
The size of an adult shell varies between 30 mm and 63 mm.

Distribution
This species occurs in the East China Sea and in the Pacific Ocean off the Solomons and Papua New Guinea.

References

 Terryn Y. (2007). Terebridae: A Collectors Guide. Conchbooks & NaturalArt. 59pp + plates
 Terryn Y. & Holford M. (2008) The Terebridae of Vanuatu with a revision of the genus Granuliterebra, Oyama 1961. Visaya Supplement 3: 1-96

External links
 

Terebridae
Gastropods described in 2001